Massimo Maffezzoli (born 21 February 1976) is an Italian basketball head coach, currently managing Sidigas Avellino in the Lega Basket Serie A (LBA) and the Basketball Champions League. He is assistant coach of Romeo Sacchetti for the Italian national team.

Career
Massimo Maffezzoli started his coach-career managing the youth sector of Scaligera Verona, SanZeno Verona, VL Pesaro, Aquila Trento and UC Casalpusterlengo from 1997 to 2008.

He later started a long career as assistant-coach of many clubs like Pallacanestro Trapani, Rimini Crabs, Veroli Basket, and Virtus Roma (in Serie A).

On 2 July 2013 Maffezzoli became assistant coach of Dinamo Sassari.

From 2016 to 2018, he was assistant coach for New Basket Brindisi.

In 2018 Maffezzoli became assistant coach for Scandone Avellino. On 10 April 2019 Maffezzoli became new head coach of Avellino.

Honours and titles
Assistant Coach
Lega Basket Serie A: 1
Dinamo Sassari (2015)
Italian Basketball Cup: 2
Dinamo Sassari (2014, 2015)
Italian Basketball Supercup: 1
Dinamo Sassari (2014)
Italian LNP Cup: 1
UC Casalpusterlengo (2007)

References

External links
Profile at legabasket.it 
Profile at fip.it 

1976 births
Living people
Italian basketball coaches
Dinamo Sassari coaches
Sportspeople from Verona